US Post Office-Dunkirk is a historic post office building located at Dunkirk in Chautauqua County, New York. It was designed and built in 1928-1929 and is one of a number of post offices in New York State designed by the Office of the Supervising Architect of the Treasury Department, James A. Wetmore. It is a two-story brick structure with a one-story rear wing, in the Colonial Revival style.  The entrance is set within a limestone surround with a Doric frieze and modest cornice.

It was listed on the National Register of Historic Places in 1988.

References

External links
US Post Office--Dunkirk, New York - U.S. National Register of Historic Places on Waymarking.com

Dunkirk
Government buildings completed in 1929
Colonial Revival architecture in New York (state)
Buildings and structures in Chautauqua County, New York
National Register of Historic Places in Chautauqua County, New York